Wally Schumann is a Canadian politician, who was elected to the Legislative Assembly of the Northwest Territories in the 2015 election. He represented the electoral district of Hay River South until the 2019 election, when he was defeated by Rocky Simpson Sr.

References 

Living people
Members of the Executive Council of the Northwest Territories
Members of the Legislative Assembly of the Northwest Territories
21st-century Canadian politicians
Year of birth missing (living people)